Overkill is the second studio album by British rock band Motörhead, released in March 1979. It was the band's first album with Bronze Records. Kerrang! magazine listed the album at number 46 among the "100 Greatest Heavy Metal Albums of All Time". American thrash metal band Overkill was named after this album.

Background
Bronze Records signed Motörhead in 1978 and booked them time in London's Wessex Studios to record a single consisting of Richard Berry's "Louie Louie" and a new song by the band called "Tear Ya Down". The band toured to promote the single "Louie Louie", which became a modest hit, while Chiswick released the Motörhead album in white vinyl, to keep the momentum going. In the Classic Albums documentary on the making of Ace of Spades, Gerry Bron of Bronze Records admits:

Sales of the single brought the band their first appearance on BBC Television's Top of the Pops, which gave Bronze the confidence to get the band back into the studio to record a second album. In the 2011 book Overkill: The Untold Story of Motörhead, biographer Joel McIver quotes guitarist "Fast" Eddie Clarke:

Speaking to James McNair of Mojo in 2011, frontman Lemmy concurred:

Recording
Overkill was co-produced by legendary producer Jimmy Miller, who had previously worked with Traffic and the Rolling Stones, and recorded at Roundhouse Recording Studios and Sound Development Studios in London. "Damage Case" was co-written by the band and Mick Farren of The Deviants. In his autobiography White Line Fever, Lemmy claims that he wrote the words to "Metropolis" "in five minutes" after seeing the movie of the same name at the Electric Cinema in Portebello Road, and also claims that he always wanted Tina Turner to record "I'll Be Your Sister", insisting:

The title track is notable for Phil "Philthy Animal" Taylor's use of two bass drums. In the documentary The Guts and the Glory the drummer recalls:

Sleeve artwork
Joe Petagno, the sleeve artist, had this to say about the cover of the album, which he felt rushed into because the band could not find him:

Release
The first release from those sessions was the single release of the title track backed with "Too Late, Too Late" in 7" and 12" pressings. In June 1979, "No Class" was lifted from the album as a follow-up single, backed with a previously unreleased song, "Like a Nightmare". While the Chiswick album Motörhead had been a hasty affair (although it had a sub-bootleg quality which some fans found appealing) Overkill had more spring and bounce, and a title track that would become a show-stopper for years to come. Three weeks after the initial release of the album in black vinyl, the album was released in a limited edition of 15,000 in green vinyl. With a view to increasing the sales, the single was released in three different covers, one each of Lemmy, Clarke and Taylor. The album was reissued on Cassette, CD and vinyl by Castle Communications in 1988, coupled with Another Perfect Day, Bronze having issued a cassette of the album coupled with Bomber in 1980.

Reception

Overkill was an unexpected success, reaching No. 24 on the UK Albums Chart. It is considered by many to be a vast improvement over the band's debut and the album where they laid the foundation for their classic sound. AllMusic: Motörhead's landmark second album, Overkill, marked a major leap forward for the band, and it remains one of their all-time best, without question. In fact, some fans consider it their single best, topping even Ace of Spades. It's a ferocious album, for sure, perfectly showcasing Motörhead's trademark style of no holds barred proto-thrash – a kind of punk-inflected heavy metal style that is sloppy and raw yet forceful and in your face." 

In 2005, Overkill was ranked number 340 in Rock Hard magazine's book of The 500 Greatest Rock & Metal Albums of All Time. However, it has also been criticised for being one dimensional, sloppy and unskilled 

Writing in the 2011 book Overkill: The Untold Story of Motörhead, biographer Joel McIver called the album "a revelation. To this day it contains six all-time classics, which is saying something from a band whose career has lasted 35 years or more."

Track listing

Original release

All tracks are written by Kilmister, Clarke and Taylor, except where noted.

Sanctuary Records 2005 2-CD deluxe edition
Disc one includes the original album without bonus tracks.

The track list in the liner notes incorrectly have 18 tracks listed, as they have repeated tracks 9 & 10 as track 9 twice. They also have Richard Berry incorrectly credited for disc 1 tracks 1, 5 & 9, when correctly it is disc 1 tracks 1-3 and disc 2 track 10. The rear of the cover has all this printed correctly though.

Personnel
Per the album's liner notes.

Motörhead
 Lemmy – bass, vocals, first solo on "Stay Clean", second guitar solo on "Limb from Limb"
 "Fast" Eddie Clarke – guitars
 Phil "Philthy Animal" Taylor – drums

Production
 Jimmy Miller – producer, remixer
 Neil Richmond – producer ("Louie Louie", "Tear Ya Down")
 Ashley Howe – engineer
 Trevor Hallesy – engineer
 Giovanni Scatola – mastering (2005 remaster)
 Joe Petagno – cover design
 Curt Evans – cover design (2005 remaster)

2005 deluxe edition remaster
 Steve Hammonds – release coordination
 Jon Richards – release coordination
 Malcolm Dome – sleeve notes
 Mick Stevenson – project consultant, photos and archive memorabilia

Charts

Certifications

References

External links
 Motörhead official website

Motörhead albums
1979 albums
Albums with cover art by Joe Petagno
Albums produced by Jimmy Miller
Bronze Records albums
Mercury Records albums
Speed metal albums